Benton Township, Arkansas may refer to:

 Benton Township, Faulkner County, Arkansas
 Benton Township, Fulton County, Arkansas

See also 
 List of townships in Arkansas
 Benton Township (disambiguation)

Arkansas township disambiguation pages